Aegialeus (Ancient Greek: Αἰγιαλεύς derived from αἰγιαλός aigialos "beach, sea-shore") also Aegealeus, Aigialeus, Egialeus, was the elder son of Adrastus, a king of Argos, and either Amphithea or Demonassa.

Mythology 
Aegialeus was identified as one of the Epigoni, who avenged their fathers' disastrous attack on the city of Thebes by retaking the city, by both Pausanias and Hellanikos.  While his father was the only one of the Seven against Thebes who did not die in the battle, Aegialeus was the only one of the leaders of the Epigoni who was killed when they retook the city.  Laodamas, the son of Eteocles, killed him at Glisas, and he was buried at Pagae in Megaris.  Adrastus died of grief after his son's death, and Diomedes, Adrastus' grandson by his daughter Deipyle, succeeded him. Aegialeus' son was Cyanippus, who took the throne following the exile of Diomedes. He was worshipped as a hero at Pegae in Megaris, and it was believed that his body had been conveyed thither from Thebes and been buried there.

Notes

References 

 Apollodorus, The Library with an English Translation by Sir James George Frazer, F.B.A., F.R.S. in 2 Volumes, Cambridge, MA, Harvard University Press; London, William Heinemann Ltd. 1921. ISBN 0-674-99135-4. Online version at the Perseus Digital Library. Greek text available from the same website.
 Gaius Julius Hyginus, Fabulae from The Myths of Hyginus translated and edited by Mary Grant. University of Kansas Publications in Humanistic Studies. Online version at the Topos Text Project.
 Pausanias, Description of Greece with an English Translation by W.H.S. Jones, Litt.D., and H.A. Ormerod, M.A., in 4 Volumes. Cambridge, MA, Harvard University Press; London, William Heinemann Ltd. 1918. . Online version at the Perseus Digital Library
 Pausanias, Graeciae Descriptio. 3 vols. Leipzig, Teubner. 1903.  Greek text available at the Perseus Digital Library.
 Tripp, Edward, Crowell's Handbook of Classical Mythology, Thomas Y. Crowell Co; First edition (June 1970). .

Epigoni
Princes in Greek mythology
Kings of Argos
Kings in Greek mythology
Argive characters in Greek mythology
Mythology of Argos